Kim Si-Hoo (born Kim Young-Joon on 2 January 1988) is a South Korean actor.

Filmography

Films

Television series

Web series

Awards and nominations

References

External links
  
 
 
 

South Korean male film actors
South Korean male television actors
1988 births
Living people
21st-century South Korean male actors